Matthew Pike (born June 3, 1972) is an American musician best known as the guitarist of stoner metal/doom metal band Sleep and the frontman of High on Fire. With High on Fire, Pike won the 2019 Grammy Award for Best Metal Performance for the song "Electric Messiah".

As a guest star, Pike provided the voices of Pickles' father and a Klokateer in Metalocalypse on late-night block Adult Swim.

Early life 

Pike was born in Southfield, Michigan. He moved to California after spending time in military school while living with his mother in Golden, Colorado. Arriving in San Jose, he realized the hardcore punk and heavy metal scenes were more active than the ones in Colorado. He made friends, attended shows, and eventually joined the sludge metal band Asbestosdeath. When playing around the Bay Area they developed a much heavier and slower sound more akin to doom metal. The quartet soon gained a following and changed their name to Sleep.

Career

Sleep 

When fellow Sleep guitarist Justin Marler quit the band, Sleep became a power trio. The band's second album, Sleep's Holy Mountain, illustrated Pike as a young Tony Iommi, playing Black Sabbath-styled riffs.

As a result of the increased press, the band's demographic and following widened greatly, and major label deals soon began surfacing. However, instead of following a path to mainstream exposure, the band fled further underground, turning down countless major label deals and submitting the one-song, full-length record Jerusalem in mid-1996. In 1997, the band called it quits after London Records refused to release the Dopesmoker/Jerusalem recordings and the pressure the members were experiencing became unbearable. Pike couldn't come to terms with the break-up and became depressed. He soon realized that his career as a musician was far from over, and began inviting people to jam in his garage. Deciding to work in a power trio again, he brought in Desmond Kensel (drums) and an old friend George Rice (bass) to play in his new band. Within six months, the jams were headed to fruition and High on Fire was developing from a simple need to play guitar again.

High on Fire 
From the ashes of Sleep rose Pike's new band, High on Fire, and while his guitar tone remained largely the same, he began playing faster and more aggressively than Sleep. Pike handles both guitar and vocal duties in the band, as well as writing a bulk of the material. High on Fire have toured constantly since their inception.

Kalas 
Pike was the frontman of the Bay Area psychedelic-metal band Kalas (formerly Scum Angel) that featured members of Econochrist, Samiam, and Cruevo. Pike set aside the guitar for Kalas, as they already featured two guitarists; his vocals were surprisingly melodic, especially compared to his snarling growls in High on Fire. After only releasing a self-titled album, Kalas split by October 2006.

Personal life 
In 2012, Pike made his problems with addiction public as he dropped off the Rockstar Mayhem Festival during the summer and went into rehab. He cited health problems caused by his heavy consumption of alcohol as the reason. He admitted to having "fallen off the wagon" a few times since. In addition to this, he has admitted to suffering from bipolar disorder, and has sustained bodily injuries from relentless years of touring.

In 2018, Pike's band High on Fire announced they would be cancelling their upcoming tour due to Pike needing a partial amputation of one of his toes. Again on January 7, 2019, they announced via their Instagram that High on Fire would be cancelling their 2019 Electric Messiah tour because of Pike's risk of losing his big toe or part of his foot, due to complications from diabetes.

He has a daughter named Lexi.

Discography 

Sleep
1991: Volume One
1992: Volume Two (EP)
1992: Sleep's Holy Mountain
1999: Jerusalem
2003: Dopesmoker
2014: The Clarity (single)
2018: The Sciences
2018: Leagues Beneath (single)
2019: Vault Package #39 – Sleep Live at Third Man Records
2022: Vault Package #52 – Sleep Dopesmoker

High on Fire
2000: The Art of Self Defense
2002: Surrounded by Thieves
2005: Blessed Black Wings
2005: Live from the Relapse Contamination Festival (live album)
2007: Death Is This Communion
2010: Snakes for the Divine
2012: De Vermis Mysteriis
2015: Luminiferous
2018: Electric Messiah

Asbestosdeath
1990: Dejection (EP)
1990: Unclean (EP)
2007: Unclean Dejection

Kalas
2006: Kalas

Pike vs. the Automaton
2022: Pike vs. the Automaton

References

External links 

 High on Fire's website
 
 2013 interview with Matt Pike
 2016 interview with Matt Pike

Lead guitarists
Musicians from Denver
Living people
1972 births
Grammy Award winners
American heavy metal guitarists
American heavy metal singers
Guitarists from Colorado
High on Fire members
Sleep (band) members
Asbestosdeath members
21st-century American singers
21st-century American guitarists